NCAA Football 2003 is a video game of the sports genre released in 2002 by EA Tiburon. Its cover athlete is former Oregon Ducks, Detroit Lions, Miami Dolphins Atlanta Falcons, and New Orleans Saints quarterback Joey Harrington.

Several additions were made to this edition of the game, such as Mascot Games with over 50 mascot teams, 3D cheerleaders, over 200 authentic fight songs, real college rivalries for coveted trophies, 28 bowl games, and more.  Like previous years, the game included such features as dynasty mode, create-a-school (notably absent from NCAA Football 2002), create-a-player, campus challenges, and has Lee Corso, Kirk Herbstreit, and Brad Nessler as narrators.

Reception

The game received "universal acclaim" on all platforms according to the review aggregation website Metacritic.

It was nominated for GameSpots annual "Best Traditional Sports Game on Xbox" award, which went to NFL 2K3.

The game sold 1.3 million units as of August 2003.

References

External links

2002 video games
College football video games
Electronic Arts games
NCAA video games
GameCube games
PlayStation 2 games
Video games set in 2003
Xbox games
Video games developed in the United States
Multiplayer and single-player video games